L'Institut de recherche d'Hydro-Québec (Hydro-Québec Research Institute), known by its acronym IREQ ("Institut de recherche en électricité du Québec", Quebec Electricity Research Institute) is a research institute established in 1967 by government-owned utility Hydro-Québec. IREQ operates from Varennes, a town on the south shore of Montreal, Quebec, Canada. IREQ operates on an annual research budget of approximately $100 million and specializes in the areas of high voltage, mechanics and thermomechanics, network simulations and calibration.

In the last 20 years, the institute has also conducted research and development work towards the electrification of ground transportation. Current projects include battery advanced materials, including work on molten salts, lithium iron phosphate and nanotitanate, improved electric drive trains and the impacts of the large scale deployment of electric vehicles on the power grid. Projects focus on technologies to increase range, improve performance in cold weather and reduce charging time.

See also 
 Hydro-Québec
TM4 Electrodynamic systems
 Tokamak

References

External links 
 IREQ home page

Hydro-Québec
Research institutes in Canada
Energy research institutes
Engineering research institutes
Materials science institutes
Energy in Canada
Research institutes established in 1967